Nico Luca Marc Delle Karth (born 24 January 1984 in Rum) is an Austrian sailor. He competed at the 2004, 2008 and 2012 Summer Olympics in the 49er class. He is the son of Werner Delle Karth, a world championship medallist in bobsleigh and a Winter Olympian.

References

Austrian male sailors (sport)
Living people
1984 births
Olympic sailors of Austria
Sailors at the 2004 Summer Olympics – 49er
Sailors at the 2008 Summer Olympics – 49er
Sailors at the 2012 Summer Olympics – 49er
Sailors at the 2016 Summer Olympics – 49er